Malindi is a town in the Mangochi District, in the Southern Region of Malawi.

Location
The geographical coordinates of Malindi, Malawi are 14°18'50.0"S, 35°17'09.0"E (Latitude:-14.313889; Longitude:35.285833).

Overview
Malindi is an urban centre in a predominantly rural setting, situated on the south-eastern shores of Lake Malawi. The town is served by St Martins' Hospital, Malindi, a 100-bed mission hospital. Also found in this town is the Malindi Mission School.

References

External links
 Malawi: UDF Candidate Wins Malindi Ward By-Election As of 11 April 2018.

Populated places in Southern Region, Malawi